The Woodman Institute Museum is located at 182 Central Avenue in Dover, New Hampshire, United States.  It is a museum dedicated to history, science and the arts. It was created in 1915 with a bequest of $100,000 from philanthropist Annie Woodman to encourage her city's education in those three fields. The institute opened on July 26, 1916. Under the name of "Woodman Institute", the museum was listed on the National Register of Historic Places in 1980.

Collection

The museum's campus now includes three brick houses of Federal style architecture, one of which is the former home of noted abolitionist Senator John P. Hale. Inside are exhibits of local history and natural history, in addition to art and antiques. One famous item is the saddle in which President Abraham Lincoln rode to review troops shortly before his assassination. A collection of artifacts showcases the nation's past, with a special emphasis on Dover's history.

Visitors can see the sword a Japanese delegate to the 1905 Portsmouth Peace Conference (Treaty of Portsmouth) gave to a waiter at the Hotel Wentworth, examples of Dover's textile output, relics from every war in which the United States has fought, an old 13 star American flag, a 10-foot stuffed polar bear from the Arctic, an old piano with genuine ivory keys, and a collection of stuffed birds, fish and mammals.

On the museum's grounds is the 1675 William Damm Garrison, one of the oldest intact garrison houses in the state, as well as the oldest house in Dover and one of the oldest houses in New Hampshire. It survived the Cochecho Massacre, and was later moved to this location for preservation under a permanent shelter. Also within the shelter, visitors may see a brass Napoleon cannon used in the American Civil War, one of only ten left in existence.

See also
List of the oldest buildings in New Hampshire
National Register of Historic Places listings in Strafford County, New Hampshire

References

External links
 Woodman Institute Museum
 Woodman Institute Museum — Quilter's Muse Virtual Museum

Federal architecture in New Hampshire
Historic house museums in New Hampshire
Houses on the National Register of Historic Places in New Hampshire
Art museums and galleries in New Hampshire
Museums in Strafford County, New Hampshire
History museums in New Hampshire
Buildings and structures in Dover, New Hampshire
Natural history museums in New Hampshire
Houses in Strafford County, New Hampshire
Museums established in 1916
1916 establishments in New Hampshire
National Register of Historic Places in Strafford County, New Hampshire